Marbla is a genus of moths in the subfamily Lymantriinae. The genus was erected by Charles Swinhoe in 1903.

Species
Marbla affinis (Hering, 1926) southern Nigeria
Marbla haplora Collenette, 1954 Uganda
Marbla divisa (Walker, 1855) western Africa
Marbla paradoxa (Hering, 1926) western Africa

References

Lymantriinae